Curtis McCormack is an American politician who has served in the Vermont House of Representatives from 1982 to 1996 and from 2012-present.

References

Living people
21st-century American politicians
Democratic Party members of the Vermont House of Representatives
Politicians from Queens, New York
Year of birth missing (living people)